Kylie Michelle Pennell (born July 24, 1978) is a former Australian rugby union player. She was named in Australia's squad for a two-test series against New Zealand in the 2007 Laurie O'Reilly Cup. She was one of four debutantes that came off the bench in the first test in Whanganui. She also featured in the Wallaroos 29–12 loss in Porirua.

Pennell was also named in Australia's squad for the 2008 O'Reilly Cup competition. She made her final Wallaroos appearance against Samoa in 2009 in Apia, Samoa.

References 

1978 births
Living people
Australian female rugby union players
Australia women's international rugby union players